Ryden Dirtay is the second studio album by American gangsta rap supergroup Psychopathic Rydas. It was released on July 3, 2001, through Joe & Joey Records. The album made it to #46 on the Independent Albums chart in the United States.

Track listing

Personnel
Bullet – vocals, lyrics
Full Clip – vocals, lyrics
Lil Shank – vocals, lyrics
Foe Foe – vocals, lyrics
Cell Block – vocals, lyrics

Charts

References

External links

2001 albums
Psychopathic Rydas albums
Gangsta rap albums by American artists